Little Bay, New South Wales is a suburb in south-eastern Sydney, Australia.

Little Bay may also refer to:

 Little Bay, Newfoundland and Labrador, Canada
 Little Bay (Newfoundland and Labrador), Canada
 Little Bay (New Hampshire), United States
 Little Bay (Port au Port Peninsula), Newfoundland and Labrador, Canada
 Little Bay, Montserrat, planned future capital of Montserrat
 Little Bay, Sint Maarten, Dutch Caribbean
 Oban, in Argyll, Scotland, whose Gaelic name An t-Òban translates as The Little Bay

See also

 Big Bay (disambiguation)
 Little Andrews Bay
 Little Assawoman Bay
 Little Bay Bridge
 Little Bay de Noc
 Little Bay East
 Little Bay Islands
 Little Kennebec Bay
 Little Machias Bay
 Little Narragansett Bay
 Little Pike Bay
 Little Traverse Bay